Walter Wallenborg (19 August 1908 – 24 November 1984) was a Norwegian footballer. He played in two matches for the Norway national football team from 1931 to 1934.

References

External links
 

1908 births
1984 deaths
Norwegian footballers
Norway international footballers
Place of birth missing
Association footballers not categorized by position